Elease Jack (born July 24, 1968), better known by her stage name the Real Roxanne, is an American hip hop MC who recorded for Select Records.

Elease was born in New York City, New York. In the 1980s, she, the producer of Roxanne Shante, and others were engaged in the Roxanne Wars, a series of answer records inspired by UTFO's hit song "Roxanne, Roxanne", being the officially sanctioned artist in response to all of the answer records.

Career
The role of the Real Roxanne was originally filled by a different woman, Elease Jack, who recorded the first single The Real Roxanne under the character's name. Meanwhile, Adelaida "Joanne" Martinez claims to have been introduced to UTFO in a fashion very similar to the Roxanne story. Already acquainted with Paul Anthony George, a member of Full Force, the group that produced UTFO:

Ironic enough, I briefly met Doc Ice and Kangol (Kid) at the Albee Square Mall in Brooklyn, and, like Roxanne, I paid them no mind when they tried to get their rap on. All this was taking place while Paul Anthony and I were just becoming friends. Full Force was looking for someone to play the permanent role of Roxanne, even though they had already cut the track with someone they picked out of a club, whom, by the way, had absolutely no rap experience. They utilized her for an answer back to outbid Roxanne Shante's track. It seems that while they tried to create this character, they were having issues with this individual and her mother, so I was told, and that's when I was asked by Paul Anthony if I would audition for the guys, and I said sure, and I did. And, from there, I kept on walking in the shoes of THE REAL Roxanne!'

Discography

Studio albums

Singles

As lead artist

Promotional singles

Guest appearances

References

Notes

Citations

External links

 Weblog Press Website (therealroxanne.com)
MySpace ~ The Real Roxanne
 Interview (rapindustry.com)

1963 births
Living people
American women rappers
Select Records artists
People from Brooklyn
21st-century American rappers
21st-century American women musicians
21st-century women rappers